Philippa Beale (born 1946) is a British visual artist, sculptor and curator.

Biography 
Philippa Beale was born in Winchester in Hampshire. She attended Winchester School of Art from 1961, and then Goldsmiths, University of London from 1965 to 1969 and the University of Reading during 1969 and 1970. She had her first solo exhibition at the Camden Arts Centre in 1972. Beale taught at the Hornsey College of Art and was the artist-in-residence at the City Art Gallery in Southampton during 1983. Beale returned to study at Goldsmith's from 1983 to 1985, and then the University of the Arts London from 2000 to 2004.

In 1978 Beale exhibited Collected from Here, a series of sculptures and photographs about her mother's orchard at the Angela Flowers Gallery in London. Soon after, she exhibited thousands of real apples at the Richard Demarco Gallery in Edinburgh. Since the 1970s Philippa has exhibited work at the Institute of Contemporary Arts in London, the Arnolfini in Bristol, the Fruit Market in Edinburgh, the Royal Academy of Arts and many major galleries. In 2009, Beale moved to France and made a permanent installation at the Church of the Virgin in Vaux, Valence en Poitou. In 2009, Beale started painting trees as part of her new polemic concerning the environment, resulting in an invitation to exhibit in 2013 in Under the Greenwood, Picturing the British Tree, at St Barbe Museum in the New Forest. In 2014 she was a founder member of the Arborealists Movement.

Beale was a senior lecturer, then principal lecturer, and director of studies at the London College of Communication, Central Saint Martins, and finally as a Ph.D. supervisor at City, University of London. Beale joined The London Group of artists in 1977 and served as its president from 1994 to 1998.

Works

Selected group exhibitions 
 2021 Being With Trees, Curator, Gustavo Bacarisis Gallery, Gibraltar. 
 2021 Being With Trees, Curator, Bermondsey Project Space, London.
 2020 The Arborealists, The Castle Museum, Taunton, South West Heritage Centre. 
 2019 The Art Of Trees: The Arborealists, Musee de St Croix, Loudun, France.
 2017 The Art of the Tree, Dortoir des Moines, Musee de St Benoit, Poitiers, France.
 2017 The Art of the Tree, Bermondsey Project Space, UK.
 2013 ‘Under the Greenwood, Picturing the British Tree’, St Barbe Art Gallery and Museum, Southampton Museum Service, Lymington.
 2007 Blue Bird and Other Stories, 30 years of Conceptual Art Practice by Philippa Beale, collaborating with Jane Humphrey, Graham Diprose, Christopher Plato London College of Communication Galleries, London.
 2002 Art and the Spirit, The Stations of the Cross, Site Specific Installation, St Pancras Church, London.
 2000	Real Bodies Virtual City, Curator with James Swinson, Outside Edge Artists Collective, London.
 1995  The London Group, Curator The Curve, Barbican Arts Centre, President of the London Group.
 1985 Critics Choice 2, by Guy Brett, Unquiet Studios, AIR Gallery. London.
 1984  Artists for Bandaid at the Royal Academy of Arts, London.
 1972	The Highgate Series, The Nostalgia Industry, Camden Arts Centre, London.
 1971 Art Spectrum London, Alexandra Palace, London, UK.

Solo exhibitions 
 2020  Imagining Trees Bermondsey Project Space, London. 
 2018 Trees, Chelsea Arts Club, London.
 2007 Retrospective 30 years of Conceptual Art Practice, LCC Galleries, London.
 2003 St Sebastian, Chelsea Arts Club, London.
 2001 Visions, Key London Ltd., Wimpole Street, London.
 1998 From Wilson to Callaghan, video viewing ICA, London.
 1997 From Wilson to Callaghan, Posterstudio, London.
 1992 Return to the Future, Exhibition with Neville Boden at the London Institute.

Gallery 
 1990 Billboards,  Dortioir sde Moines,  Musse de Saint Benoit near Poitiers, France.
 1985 Critics Choice 2, by Guy Brett Unquiet Studios, AIR Gallery. London.
 1984 Blue Bird, Southampton City Art Gallery – about the exploration of children in the media.
 1982 Baby Love  Angela Flowers Gallery, London.
 1981 His Ears are Small and Neat, His Chest is Covered with Soft Brown Hair, two multi-lingual artworks examining advertising.  Akumulatory 2 Galleria, Poznan, Poland.
 1978 Newtons Wonder, an installation of 100’s 1bs of apples raising environmental questions – Richard Demarco Gallery, Edinburgh.
 1977 Collected from There, evidence collected from an Orchard, Angela Flowers Gallery, London. Collected from Here, evidence of reclamation, of the Acme Gallery site, Acme Gallery, London.
 1973 Highgate Series, the Nostalgia Industry, Park Square Gallery, Leeds.
 1972 Highgate Series, The Nostalgia Industry, Camden Arts Centre, London.

References 

1946 births
Living people
20th-century English women artists
21st-century English women artists
Alumni of Goldsmiths, University of London
Alumni of the University of Reading
Alumni of the University of the Arts London
Artists from Winchester
English women sculptors
English women painters
British women curators